Of Mice and Men is a 1992 American period drama western film based on John Steinbeck's 1937 novella of the same name. Directed and produced by Gary Sinise, the film features Sinise as George Milton, alongside John Malkovich as Lennie Small, with Casey Siemaszko as Curley, John Terry as Slim, Ray Walston as Candy, Joe Morton as Crooks, and Sherilyn Fenn as Curley's wife.

Horton Foote adapted the story for film. Its plot centers on George and the intellectually disabled Lennie, two farm workers who travel together and dream of one day owning their own land. The film explores themes of discrimination, loneliness, and the American Dream, as well as the desire for a place to call home. 

Of Mice and Men took part in the 1992 Cannes Film Festival, where Sinise was nominated for the Palme d'Or award, given to the director of the best-featured film. After the film debuted in the United States on October 2, 1992, it received acclaim from critics.

Plot

The movie opens with George reminiscing in a boxcar.

During the Great Depression, quick-witted George Milton and physically strong but mentally disabled Lennie Small are fleeing their previous employment, where Lennie was accused of attempted rape after he held on to a young woman, prompted by his love of stroking soft things. They travel to work on Tyler ranch near Soledad.

George reluctantly agrees to tell Lennie again about their dream, describing how they will one day have their own piece of land where Lennie will tend their rabbits. George says if Lennie should ever get in trouble, he is to hide in the brush and wait for him. At Tyler Ranch, the Boss is suspicious of Lennie's mental condition. George lies to the boss saying Lennie is his cousin and was kicked in the head by a horse when he was a child. They befriend old one-handed ranch-hand Candy, but dislike the Boss' son, Curley, who hates people bigger than him. Curley's attractive wife flirts with Lennie and George, and George instructs Lennie to avoid her.

George meets their work team, respected head man Slim, and Carlson, who suggests they shoot Candy's sick old dog and get one of his pups. Lennie excitedly asks George for a pup. After a hard day, George is proud of Lennie's work and gets him his puppy. Candy offers to pitch in with Lennie and George to buy their farm. Just as it seems their dream is moving closer to fruition, Curley accuses Slim of keeping his wife company. Curley viciously attacks Lennie for laughing, yelling at him to fight back. Prompted by George, Lennie crushes Curley's hand. George fears for their jobs, but Slim gives Curley an ultimatum: if Curley tries to get George and Lennie fired, Slim will humiliate Curley by telling everyone how Curley's hand really got crushed. Concerned for his reputation, Curley reluctantly agrees to say his hand got caught in a machine.

Lennie talks about being lonely, and Curley's wife attempts to engage him in conversation. Frustrated, she runs to the house in tears vowing to leave the ranch forever. In the barn that evening, Lennie has accidentally killed his puppy and is greatly upset. Curley's wife enters and admits her loneliness, confiding that her dreams of being a movie star were crushed. Learning of Lennie's love of petting soft things, she lets him stroke her hair. She soon complains and then screams that he is pulling too hard. Trying to keep her quiet, Lennie accidentally breaks her neck. He runs to hide in the brush as George told him to do. Candy finds Curley's wife dead and informs George. Curley leads a lynch mob but George finds Lennie first and calms him by retelling their dream. As George gets to the part where Lennie tends the rabbits, he shoots Lennie in the back of the head, sparing him from a cruel death at the hands of the mob.

The scene returns to George in the boxcar, heading South, sadly remembering his times working with Lennie.

Cast

 Gary Sinise as George Milton
 John Malkovich as Lennie Small
 Ray Walston as Candy
 Casey Siemaszko as Curley
 Sherilyn Fenn as Curley's wife
 Noble Willingham as the Boss
 John Terry as Slim
 Richard Riehle as Carlson
 Joe Morton as Crooks 
 Mark Boone Junior as the Bus Driver
 Moira Harris as the Girl in the Red Dress
 Robert (later Alexis) Arquette as Whitt

Production
The first experience Sinise had with Steinbeck's work came when Sinise attended Highland Park High School. His drama class went to Guthrie Theater and observed three plays in two days, one being Of Mice and Men. After viewing the play, he "stood up and applauded" and "was trying to scream some sort of acknowledgement of my feelings ... but I was so choked up nothing came out except tears." He credits the play with "[introducing] me to literature".

Themes 
Through the story of George and Lennie and their pursuit of a place to call home Steinbeck highlights that sometimes as stated by Charlotte Cook Hadella in her book Of Mice and Men: A Kinship of Powerlessness, "real life is more complex than 'life' as depicted in realistic art." This is shown in George and Lennie's pursuit of the American dream, which to them meant purchasing their own farm so they would finally have a place to call their own. What follows is a tragic tale of how life can be more unpredictable and tragic than any film or novel ever devised.

Historical context 
The Great Depression was a period within the 1930s that reflected a great growth between the wealth-gap in America. As Steinbeck worked as a laborer during the 1920s, he was exposed to the lives of many migrant workers and their stories of hardship, many of which were reflected in his early works. According to Hadella, "one of his earliest published stories, “Fingers of Cloud” (1924), takes place in the bunkhouse of a Filipino work gang. Tortilla Flat (1935), his first commercial success, details the lives of the paisanos, people of Spanish-Mexican descent who lived in the hills above Monterey. Juan Chicoy, a Mexican Indian, is the central character in The Wayward Bus (1947). Given the multiracial configuration of the California labor force in the early decades of the twentieth century, we may conclude that in Of Mice and Men, where the laborers are white Americans, Steinbeck did not intend to draw an accurate sociohistorical picture. Still, the subsistence-level economy, the tensions between workers and owners, and the social marginality of the migrant workers in the novella ring true to the historical details of the actual setting."

Differences between the film and book 
While the film and book tell the same story, there are some creative liberties taken within the film, such as the scene that depicts Lennie killing the puppy. In the book Lennie feels remorse for what he has done, while in the film he simply paces around while holding the puppy. This shows how the book depicts Lennie in a much more sympathetic fashion compared to the film. Another difference between the film and the book is the important scene depicting George shooting Lennie. In the movie George shoots Lennie very quickly with little to no hesitation, while in the book George hesitates to shoot Lennie, which shows how he is depicted as a more sympathetic character within the book. Another difference is the depiction of the character of Curley's wife. In the book she is depicted as flirtatious and cruel and when she dies she is painted as less of a victim than in the movie, where she is depicted as more bored and therefore painted as more of a victim.

Release and reception
On April 16, 1992, Gilles Jacob, director of the Cannes Film Festival, announced the 27 films competing in the "Official Competition" category, including Of Mice and Men. The film premiered the next month, and was Sinise's second film to compete at Cannes, after the 1988 feature Miles from Home. After viewing Of Mice and Men, critic Don Marshall noted how the audience gave a standing ovation to its cast. Marshall said he was "surprised" that the film did not win an award, although Sinise was nominated for the Palme d'Or, given to the director of the best featured film.

The film made its American debut on October 2, 1992, and grossed $5,471,088 from a total of 398 theaters. Despite what the Los Angeles Daily News described as a "poor box office performance", the film received positive critical acclaim.   Critic Roger Ebert complimented the cast on their attention to detail. Writing for Variety, Todd McCarthy was impressed at the set design, and contrasted the film's "lovely, burnished hues" with the studio-produced 1939 film. He went on to say that the actors' performances were "sterling" and gave the supporting cast positive reception. Vincent Canby of The New York Times also praised the physical production and supporting cast, but added that the film "is not very exciting", possibly because "looking back at Lennie and George with the perspective of time robs them of their urgency." The Austin Chronicle Steve Davis called Of Mice and Men "unassuming but well-made".

MGM released Of Mice and Men on VHS in 1993 and on Video CD in 1995. The film was later released as a DVD by MGM Home Entertainment on March 4, 2003. The DVD is featured in widescreen with English, French, and Spanish subtitles, and has the option of French dubbing. The film was then released on Blu-ray by Olive Films on January 19, 2016.

References

External links
 
 
 
 
 

1992 films
American drama films
1992 Western (genre) films
American Western (genre) films
American buddy drama films
Films based on American novels
Films based on works by John Steinbeck
Films directed by Gary Sinise
Films set in California
Films set on farms
Films set in the 1930s
Films shot in California
Great Depression films
Metro-Goldwyn-Mayer films
Films with screenplays by Horton Foote
Film 1992
Films scored by Mark Isham
1990s buddy drama films
1990s English-language films
1990s American films
Films about disability